Hugh O'Neill (Irish: Aodh Mór Ó Néill; literally Hugh The Great O'Neill;  – 20 July 1616), was an Irish Gaelic lord, Earl of Tyrone (known as the Great Earl) and was later created The Ó Néill Mór, Chief of the Name. O'Neill's career was played out against the background of the Tudor conquest of Ireland, and he is best known for leading a coalition of Irish clans during the Nine Years' War, the strongest threat to the House of Tudor in Ireland since the uprising of Silken Thomas against King Henry VIII.

Family background and early career 

{{Tree chart|ArtON| |BrnD2| |Sbjct|y|SbhOD|boxstyle=border-width: 1px; border-radius: 0.5em;
 |ArtON=[[Art MacBaron O'Neill|ArtMacBaron]]
 |BrnD2=Brian2nd EarlTyrone|boxstyle_BrnD2=border-width: 1px; border-radius: 0.5em; background: lavender;
 |Sbjct=Hugh3rd EarlTyrone|boxstyle_Sbjct=border: 2px solid red; border-radius: 0.5em; background: lavender;
 |SbhOD=SiobhanO'Donnell}}

Hugh O'Neill came from a line of the O'Neill dynasty—derbfine—that the English authorities recognized as the legitimate successors to the Chiefs of the O'Neills and to the title of Earl of Tyrone. He was the second son of Matthew O'Neill, also called Feardorach, reputed illegitimate son of Conn, 1st Earl of Tyrone.

Shane O'Neill, a legitimate son of Conn O'Neill, employed the ambivalent status of Matthew's paternity to affirm his own claim to the title "The O'Neill". This claim centred on the claim that Matthew was the son of a Dublin blacksmith surnamed Kelly and his wife Alison, whom Conn Bacagh had had an affair with. This would render Matthew illegitimate in both the Irish and English systems of succession.

In the ensuing conflict for the succession, Matthew was killed by the O'Donnelly followers of Shane and Conn, placing his sons Brian and Hugh in a precarious situation. The continuing support for their claims came from the English administration in Dublin Castle, which was anxious to use the support of the sons of Matthew to break the independent power of the O'Neill lords of Ulster. This was part of a general English policy to transform Irish Gaelic titles into feudal titles granted under the Crown that would bring them entirely within the English legal system through a policy known as surrender and regrant, in which the Irish Clan Chiefs forcibly surrendered their lands to the Crown and had them granted back into their keeping as property of the Crown, rather than the property of the sept, or Gaelic extended family.

Hugh succeeded his brother, Brian, as baron of Dungannon, when the latter was assassinated by Shane's tanist Turlough Luineach O'Neill in 1562. Hugh O'Neill was proclaimed Earl of Tyrone in 1585 but when he went through the ancient ritual of becoming 'The O'Neill', the Chief of Tír Eoghain, in 1595, he had thrown down the gauntlet to Tudor power.
O'Neill became a ward of the state and was brought up in the Hovendan household, an Anglo-Irish family, at Balgriffin, outside Dublin, in the Pale. Growing up in an area of English control he had knowledge of English customs and politics, mainly through his attendance at the Irish Parliament and the court in England. He was able to secure allies such as the Earls of Ormonde and Leicester. But after the death of Shane he returned to Ulster in 1567 under the protection of Sir Henry Sidney, Lord Deputy of Ireland. In Tír Eoghain, Hugh's cousin, Turlough Luineach O'Neill, had succeeded Shane O'Neill as The O'Neill, or chieftain, but was not recognized by the English as the legitimate Earl of Tyrone. The Crown, therefore, supported Hugh O'Neill as the rightful claimant and as an ally in Gaelic-controlled Ulster.

During the Second Desmond Rebellion in Munster, he fought in 1580 with the English forces against Gerald FitzGerald, 14th Earl of Desmond, and assisted Sir John Perrot against Sorley Boy, the first Chief of Clan MacDonnell of the Glens in 1584. English commander Grey described him as the "first Irish lord to spill blood".

 Rise to power 
In the following year he was summoned to attend the Irish House of Lords in Dublin as Earl of Tyrone and, in 1587 after a visit to the Court in England, he was awarded a patent to the lands of his grandfather, the first earl, Conn O'Neill.

However, with Turlough now having succeeded Shane as The O'Neill, he had yet to choose as tanist. The position was contested by Hugh and Shane's sons, the MacShanes. Due to their father, the MacShanes were favoured within Tyrone, but outside the kingdom, they were disliked because of the cruelty of their father towards the various smaller Kingdoms under the overlordship of the O'Neills. Furthermore, the MacShanes had lost a valuable ally in their kin, the Fitzgeralds of Desmond, following their defeat in the Desmond Wars.

Hugh, through marriage, was able to gain an important ally in the Red Hugh O'Donnell of Tír Chonaill, from whom he was able to secure Scottish mercenaries to fight the MacShanes. In turn, Hugh supported O'Donnell in a succession dispute within his own kingdom.

Through his other contacts, Hugh had the support of lords and Earl's in Ormonde, Leicester and Argyll, and even had the support of Lord Deputy of Ireland Fitzwilliam, whom he bribed. With this overwhelming alliance, in 1592 Turlough was forced to name Hugh as his tanist. Afterwards, Hugh murdered Hugh Gavelagh McShane, whom he reputedly hanged over a Hawthorn tree with his bare hands.

But it was during this war of succession that the English administration had begun to become suspicious of O'Neill's ambitions, and in 1587 they kidnapped Hugh's ally Red Hugh O'Donnell, holding him in Dublin Castle, along with Art MacShane O'Neill. After several failed attempts to break him out of prison, in the winter of 1591 O'Neill was finally able to successfully aid the escape of O'Donnell and MacShane, possibly through the bribing of high-level officials in Dublin.

The pair of fugitives fled the city to the Wicklow Mountains, a stronghold of the O'Byrnes, who were led by Fiach McHugh O'Byrne, one of O'Neill's allies. An O'Byrne search party found the two buried in snow and close to death near Glendalough. Red Hugh famously lost his two big toes to frostbite, but MacShane died. While it is believed MacShane died of exposure, there has been some speculation as to whether O'Neill had the O'Byrnes kill MacShane when they found him, to remove him as a political opponent of O'Neill.

His constant disputes with Turlough were fomented by the English with a view to weakening the power of the O'Neills, but the two came to some agreement and Turlough abdicated in 1593. Hugh was subsequently inaugurated as The O'Neill at Tullyhogue in the style of the former Gaelic kings, and became the most powerful lord in Ulster. Turlough died in 1595.

 Career 
O'Neill's career was marked by unceasing power politics: at one time he appeared to submit to English authority, and at another intrigued against the Dublin government in conjunction with lesser Irish clan chiefs. In keeping with the practice common at the time, he bribed officials both in Ireland and at Elizabeth I's court in London. Though entirely supported by the Dublin administration in his early years, he seems to have been unsure whether his position as Chief of the O'Neills was best secured by an alliance with the English or by rebellion against the advance of their government into Ulster from 1585.

O'Neill ruled as a sort of absolute monarch. Upon claiming the title of the O'Neill, Hugh decided that he needed to increase the revenue he was generating from the taxes on his subjects. Eventually, he was generating £80,000 of revenue. For comparison, in the 1540s the Tudor monarchy in England had been only making £40,000 of revenue. Although that figure had certainly increased since then, in financial terms O'Neill was in a position to challenge the English administration.

He also tied the peasantry to the land, effectively making them serfs, increasing production of materials and guaranteeing his supply of labour. The increased revenue allowed him to purchase muskets, pikes and ammunition from Britain. He also had several Spanish and English military advisors in his pay, the Spanish ones having been sent by Philip II of Spain.

O'Neill, like his predecessor Shane O'Neill, introduced conscription to all men within his country, regardless of their social class. Ultimately, the increased cash flow, coupled with the production of materials from the larger labour force, allowed O'Neill to arm and feed over 8,000 men—quite impressive for a Gaelic lord. The force was trained and equipped with the latest European weapons and tactics.

In the early 1590s, the English government in Ulster took the form of a Provincial Presidency, to be headed by the colonist, Henry Bagenal who lived at Newry. In 1591, O'Neill roused the ire of Bagenal by eloping with his sister, Mabel, but showed his loyalty to the crown with his military support for his brother-in-law in the defeat of Hugh Maguire at Belleek in 1593. After Mabel's death, O'Neill gradually fell into a barely concealed opposition to the crown and sought aid from Spain and the Highlands and Islands of Scotland. In 1595, Sir John Norris was ordered to Ireland at the head of a considerable force for the purpose of subduing him, but O'Neill succeeded in taking the Blackwater Fort before Norris could prepare his forces. O'Neill was instantly proclaimed a traitor at Dundalk. The war that followed is known as the Nine Years' War.

 Nine Years' War 

O'Neill followed Shane's policy of arming his Clansmen, rather than relying as Turlough had done upon Scots mercenary soldiers, such as redshanks or Irish professionals employed under buannacht. This policy allowed him to field an impressive force, with calivers and gunpowder supplied from Spain and Scotland, and in 1595 he gave the crown authorities a shock by ambushing and routing a small English army at the Battle of Clontibret. He and other clan chiefs then offered the crown of Ireland to King Philip II of Spain who refused it.

In spite of the traditional enmity between his people and the Chiefs of Clan O'Donnell, O'Neill allied himself with Hugh Roe O'Donnell, son of Shane's former ally and enemy Hugh O'Donnell, and the two chieftains opened communications with King Philip II of Spain. In some of their letters to the king—intercepted by the lord deputy, Sir William Russell—they were shown to have promoted themselves as champions of the Roman Catholic Church, claiming liberty of conscience as well as political liberty for the native inhabitants of Ireland. In April 1596, O'Neill received promises of help from Spain and thereafter chose to temporize with the authorities, professing his loyalty to the crown whenever circumstances required. This policy was a success and, even though Sir John Norris sought to bring him to heel, O'Neill managed to defer English attempts on his territory for more than two years.

In 1598, a cessation of hostilities was arranged and a formal pardon was granted to O'Neill by Queen Elizabeth. Within two months he was again in the field, and on 14 August he destroyed an English army at the Battle of the Yellow Ford on the Blackwater river, in which engagement the English Commander, Henry Bagenal, was killed. It was the greatest of all setbacks to English arms in Ireland. If the Earl had been capable of driving home his advantage, he might have successfully upset English power in the country, as discontent had broken out in every part—and especially in the south, where James Fitzthomas Fitzgerald with O'Neill's support was asserting his claim to the Earldom of Desmond at the head of a formidable army of clans loyal to the Geraldines—discontent broke into open rebellion. But Tyrone, who possessed but little generalship, procrastinated until the golden opportunity was lost.

Eight months after the battle of the Yellow Ford, a new Lord Lieutenant, the Earl of Essex, landed in Ireland with an expeditionary force sent there from England of 16,000 troops and 1,500 horses. After months of ill-managed operations in the south of the country, and the loss of three-quarters of his forces to disease, desertion, and execution of hundreds of troops for cowardice he had a parley with Tyrone at a ford on the Lagan on 7 September 1599, when a truce was arranged. Elizabeth was displeased by the favourable conditions allowed to O'Neill, as she pointed out, if she had intended to simply abandon Ireland she would not have needed to send Essex there, and by Essex's treatment of him as an equal. The Lord Lieutenant then travelled back to the Queen's court near London without permission—a desperate move, which culminated, more than a year later, in a failed attempt at an uprising in London, and weeks after, his execution for high treason on 25 February 1601.

The queen was in a tricky situation because political discourse was dominated by the issue of the succession to the throne, just as her most illustrious military commanders were being frustrated by O'Neill in the middle of the Anglo-Spanish War. Tyrone continued to concert measures with the Irish Clans in Munster, and issued a manifesto to the Catholics of Ireland, summoning them to join his standard as he protested that the interests of religion were his first care. After a campaign in Munster in January 1600, during which the Anglo-Irish Plantation of Munster was destroyed, he hastened north to Donegal, where he received supplies from Spain and a token of encouragement from Pope Clement VIII. At this point the controversial Jesuit, James Archer, was effectively operating as his representative at the Spanish court.

In May 1600 the English achieved a strategic breakthrough, when Sir Henry Docwra, at the head of a considerable army, took up a position in O'Neill's rear at Derry; meanwhile, the new lord deputy, Sir Charles Blount, 8th Baron Mountjoy (a protégé of Essex), marched in support from Westmeath to Newry, compelling O'Neill to retire to Armagh. A large reward was offered for the rebel's capture, dead or alive.

In October 1601, the long-awaited aid from Spain appeared in the form of an army under Don Juan de Aguila, which occupied the town of Kinsale in the extreme south of the country. Mountjoy rushed to contain the Spanish, while O'Neill and O'Donnell were compelled to hazard their armies in separate marches from the north, through territories defended by Sir George Carew, in the depths of a severe winter. They gained little support en route. At Bandon they joined, and then blockaded the English army that was laying siege to the Spanish. The English were in a poor state, with many of their troops disabled with dysentery, and the extreme winter weather made life in camp very difficult. But owing to poor communications with the besieged Spanish and a crucial failure to withstand the shock of a daring English cavalry charge, O'Neill's army was quickly dispersed. The Irish clans retreated, and the Spanish commander surrendered. The defeat at the battle of Kinsale was a disaster for O'Neill and ended his chances of winning the war.

O'Donnell went to Spain to seek further assistance, where he died soon afterwards (there was evidence to show poisoning by Anglo-Irish double agent James "Spanish" Blake was suspected, however, he most likely died of the flu). With a shattered force, O'Neill made his way once more to the north, where he renewed his policy of ostensibly seeking pardon while warily defending his territory. English forces managed to destroy crops and livestock in Ulster in 1601–1602, especially in the lands of O'Neill's principal vassal, Donal O'Cahan. This led to O'Cahan's withdrawal from O'Neill, and fatally weakened his power. In June 1602 O'Neill destroyed his capital at Dungannon and retreated into the woods of Glenconkeyne. Early in 1603, Elizabeth instructed Mountjoy to open negotiations with the rebellious chieftains, and O'Neill made his submission in the following April to Mountjoy, who skilfully concealed the news of the queen's death until the negotiations had concluded.

 Peace settlement 

O'Neill went with Mountjoy to Dublin, where he heard of the accession of King James I. He presented himself at the court of the king in June, accompanied by Rory O'Donnell, who had become chief of the O'Donnells after the departure of his brother Hugh Roe. The English courtiers were greatly incensed at the gracious reception accorded by James to these notable rebels.

Although O'Neill was confirmed in his title and core estates, upon his return to Ireland he immediately fell into dispute with Chichester's Dublin administration. Under the 1603 peace agreement most of his land had been given to his former Brehon law tenants. in the case of the Bann Fishery, the government eventually established that his entitlement to the benefit of that property was nullified on account of the original Anglo-Norman conquest in 1172, a precedent of significant implications for the former Gaelic polity. In the meantime, it was the dispute over O'Neill's rights concerning certain of his former feudatories—Donal O'Cahan being the most important—that led to his flight from Ireland. They were now freeholders of the Kingdom of Ireland, with new legal rights, but O'Neill expected them to support him as in the past, which they declined to do. In O'Cahan's case, the Ó Catháin clan had traditionally inaugurated the O'Neill kings in the past. Chichester considered O'Cahan's case to be pivotal, as if he caved in to O'Neill then other Ulster chiefs might also be persuaded to give up their freehold rights, and another war might follow.

This dispute dragged on until 1607, when O'Neill was invited by King James to go to London to argue his case. Warned, however, that his arrest was imminent (and possibly persuaded by Rory O'Donnell, 1st Earl of Tyrconnell—whose relations with Spain had endangered his own safety) the decision was made to flee to Spain.

 Flight 

"The Flight of the Earls" occurred on 14 September 1607, when O'Neill and O'Donnell embarked at midnight at Rathmullan on Lough Swilly on a voyage bound for Spain. Accompanying them were their wives, families and retainers, numbering ninety-nine persons. Driven by contrary winds to the east, they took shelter in the Seine estuary and were told by the Spanish to pass the winter in the Spanish Netherlands and not to proceed to Spain itself. In April 1608, they proceeded to Rome, where they were welcomed and hospitably entertained by Pope Paul V. The journey to Rome was recorded in great detail by Tadhg Ó Cianáin. In November 1607 the flight was proclaimed as treasonous by James I. A bill of attainder was passed against O'Neill by the Parliament of Ireland in 1613.

The hopes of the earls for military support foundered as Philip III of Spain wanted to maintain the recent 1604 peace treaty with James I of England, the Spanish economy had gone bankrupt in 1596 and its European fleet had been destroyed some months earlier by the Dutch Republic at the Battle of Gibraltar. This suggests that the Flight was impulsive and unplanned.

O'Neill died in Italy in the city of Rome on 20 July 1616 and was interred in the church of San Pietro in Montorio. Throughout his nine-year exile he was active in plotting a return to Ireland, toying variously both with schemes to oust English authority outright and with proposed offers of pardon from London. When the former Crown loyalist Sir Cahir O'Doherty launched O'Doherty's rebellion by the Burning of Derry in 1608, it raised hopes of a return, but the rebellion was quickly defeated. Oghy (Eochaidh) O'Hanlon was Hugh's nephew and played a leading role in O'Doherty's rebellion. As a principal rebel leader, O'Hanlon had been stripped of his inheritance by Sir Arthur Chichester, and he may have been taken into protective custody before his exile to Sweden. O'Hanlon was pressed into Swedish military service and threatened with execution if he resisted.

Upon news of his death, the court poets of Ireland engaged in the contention of the bards.

 Status in Ireland 
In 1598 O'Neill appointed James FitzThomas FitzGerald, the so-called Sugán Earl, as Earl of Desmond. Two years later in his camp at Inniscarra near Cork city, he recognized the celebrated Florence MacCarthy as The MacCarthy Mor or Prince of Desmond. The fiasco of the 1599 campaign by Essex in Ireland added to the power vacuum in most parts of Ireland.

O'Neill had little influence on the Lords of the Pale in Leinster, and his army had to feed itself by plunder, making him unpopular. He made enemies of some lords by interfering in their traditional autonomy if they did not give him their entire support. These included Lord Inchiquin; Ulick Burke, 3rd Earl of Clanricarde; the Magennis of west County Down and Tiobóid na Long Bourke.

O'Neill issued a proclamation to the Pale Lords on 15 November 1599, many of whom were Roman Catholic, protesting that his campaign was not for personal power but only for the freedom of the Catholic religion. This was unconvincing to them, as before 1593 he had practised as an Anglican, and was not known for having any great interest in religion.

At the international level, O'Neill and O'Donnell had offered themselves as vassals of King Philip II of Spain in late 1595, and suggested that Archduke Albert might be crowned Prince of Ireland, which was declined. In late 1599, in a strong position after Essex's failed campaign, O'Neill sent a list of 22 proposed terms for a peace agreement to Queen Elizabeth, including a request on the status of future English viceroys. This amounted to accepting English sovereignty over Ireland as a reality while hoping for tolerance and a strong Irish-led administration. The proposal was ignored.

 Family 
O'Neill was married four times:
Married a daughter, probably Katherine, of Brian Mac Phelim O'Neill of Clandeboye in 1574, the marriage was annulled on grounds of consanguinity, although they had had several children. She subsequently married Niall MacBrian Faghartach.
1574 married Siobhán (or Joanna; died 1591), daughter of Sir Hugh O'Donnell. In 1579 this marriage was repudiated, but shortly afterwards they were reconciled. They had two sons, and three daughters.
Hugh (1585–1609). He was known as the baron of Dungannon, died in Rome and was buried in San Pietro di Montorio.
Henry O'Neill (1586?–1617×21). He became a colonel of an Irish regiment in the Archduke's army.
Ursula, said to have been married to Sir Nicholas Bagenal.
Sorcha (or Sarah), who married to Arthur Magennis, 1st Viscount Iveagh.
a daughter who married The 3rd Viscount Mountgarret. 
Mabel Bagenal (died 1595), the daughter of Sir Nicholas Bagenal.
Catherine Magennis (died 15 March 1619) daughter of Sir Hugh Magennis of Iveagh. She accompanied O'Neill on his flight, and is believed to have died at Louvain. She was the mother of several daughters, one of whom, Aellis (Elice, or Alice), married The 1st Earl of Antrim and another Hugh Roe O'Donnell. She also had three sons:
John O'Neill or Shane Niall (died 1641). He called himself The 3rd Earl of Tyrone. He entered the Spanish army, was called "El conde de Tyrone", and was killed in Catalonia. 
Con Brian (died 16 August 1617), who either was murdered or committed suicide in Brussels.

It is probable O'Neill married a fifth time, for mention is made of a young Countess of Tyrone during his residence in Rome. He had, in addition, numerous illegitimate children, of whom one, Con, who was left behind at the time of the flight, was educated at Eton College as a Protestant, and died apparently about 1622 in the Tower of London.

 Dramatic portrayals 
 In his 1861 poem Eirinn a' Gul ("Ireland Weeping"), Uilleam Mac Dhunlèibhe, an important figure in 19th century Scottish Gaelic literature, recalled the many stories about his fellow Gaels in Inis Fáil (Ireland) he had heard in the Ceilidh houses of Islay, before that island was emptied by the Highland Clearances. He then lamented the destruction wreaked upon the Irish people by both famine and similar mass evictions ordered by Anglo-Irish landlords. He particularly laments the loss of the Chiefs of the Irish clans, who led their clansmen in war and provided "leadership of the old and true Gaelic kind". Mac Dhunlèibhe comments sadly that the mid-19th century fighters for Irish republicanism had none of the heroic qualities shown by Red Hugh O'Donnell, Hugh O'Neill, and Hugh Maguire during the Nine Years War against Queen Elizabeth I. Sadly, but expressing hope for the future of the Irish people, Mac Dhunlèibhe closes by asking where are the Irish clan warriors who charged out of the mist and slaughtered the armies of the Stranger at the Battle of the Yellow Ford and the Battle of Moyry Pass.
 Hugh O'Neill was played by Alan Hale Sr. in The Private Lives of Elizabeth and Essex (1939).
 Hugh O'Neill was portrayed by Tom Adams in the Disney film: The Fighting Prince of Donegal (1966) with a character name change to Henry O'Neill.
In the 1971 BBC drama Elizabeth R he was played by Patrick O'Connell.
 O'Neill is the central character in Brian Friel's play Making History (1989), which is concerned largely with his third marriage to Mabel Bagenal: Friel describes the marriage as a genuine if ill-fated love affair.
 Running Beast (2007), a musical theatre piece by playwright Donal O'Kelly with music by the composer Michael Holohan, commemorating The Flight of the Earls 1607–2007.
 The Rebel Crown, a one-man play on the turbulent life of Hugh O'Neill was produced at the Burnavon theatre in Cookstown, County Tyrone in May 2016 and at The Markets Theatre in Armagh, to commemorate the 400th anniversary of Hugh's Death in Rome in 1616. Written and performed by Owen O'Neill, writer, comedian and poet.
 Published in 2022, John Crowley's novel,  Flint & Mirror: A Novel of History and Magic, centres on Hugh O'Neill, imagining him as a man whose loyalties are magically divided between the Queen of England and the old gods of Ireland.

 Notes and references 
 Notes 

 Citations 

 Sources 

 
 
 
  – S to T
  – Ab-Adam to Basing
 
  – (Snippet view)
 
  – (Snippet view)
 
 
 
  – Irish stem
 Attribution' 

 Further reading 
 Secondary sources 

Nicholas P. Canny – The Elizabethan Conquest of Ireland: A Pattern Established, 1565–76'' (London, 1976) .
 
  – (Preview)
  – (Preview)
  — For the Battle of the Yellow Ford
 
 
James O'Neill, The Nine Years War, 1593–1603: O'Neill, Mountjoy and the Military Revolution (Four Courts Press, Dublin, 2017).

Primary sources 
 

Hugh O'Neill, War aims, in 

  – 1600 to 1601
  – 1601 to 1602

External links 
 Cáit ar ghabhadar Gaoidhil? at History Ireland

 

 

1550s births
1616 deaths
16th-century Irish people
17th-century Irish people
Burials at San Pietro in Montorio
Tyrone, Hugh O'Neill, 2nd Earl of
Flight of the Earls
Irish chiefs of the name
Irish emigrants to Italy
ONeill
O'Neill dynasty
People of Elizabethan Ireland
People of the Nine Years' War (Ireland)
People of the Second Desmond Rebellion